Kitzbühel is a medieval town situated in the Kitzbühel Alps along the river Kitzbüheler Ache in Tyrol, Austria, about  east of the state capital Innsbruck and is the administrative centre of the Kitzbühel district. Kitzbühel is one of the most famous and exclusive ski resorts in the world. It is frequented primarily by the international high society and has the most expensive real estate in Austria. The proximity to Munich has made it a preferred location for vacation homes among the German elite.

Geography 

Kitzbühel is situated in the Kitzbühel Alps between Zell am See and Innsbruck. It lies in the Leukental valley on the Kitzbüheler Ache river.

The town is subdivided into the municipalities of Am Horn, Aschbachbichl, Badhaussiedlung, Bichlach, Ecking, Felseneck, Griesenau, Griesenauweg, Gundhabing, Hagstein, Hausstatt, Henntal, Jodlfeld, Kaps, Mühlau, Obernau, Schattberg, Seereith, Siedlung Frieden, Am Sonnberg, Sonnenhoffeld, Staudach, Stockerdörfl and Zephirau.

The neighbouring municipalities are Aurach bei Kitzbühel, Jochberg, Kirchberg in Tirol, Oberndorf in Tirol, Reith bei Kitzbühel, St. Johann in Tirol and Fieberbrunn.

Kitzbühel's historic centre is mainly car-free and hosts a large selection of luxury shops, cafés and fine dining restaurants.

Climate

History

Earliest people
The first known settlers were Illyrians mining copper in the hills around Kitzbühel between 1100 and 800 BC.

Around 15 BC, the Romans under Emperor Augustus extended their empire to include the Alps and established the province of Noricum. After the fall of the western Roman Empire, Bavarii settled in the Kitzbühel region around 800 and started clearing forests.

Middle Ages
In the 12th century, the name Chizbuhel is mentioned for the first time in a document belonging to the Chiemsee monastery (where it refers to a "Marquard von Chizbuhel"), whereby Chizzo relates to a Bavarian clan and Bühel refers to the location of a settlement upon a hill. One hundred years later a source refers to the Vogtei of the Bamberg monastery in Kicemgespuchel and, in the 1271 document elevating the settlement to the status of a town, the place is called Chizzingenspuehel.

Kitzbühel became part of Upper Bavaria in 1255 when Bavaria was first partitioned. Duke Ludwig II of Bavaria granted Kitzbühel town rights on 6 June 1271, and it was fortified with defensive town walls. During the next centuries the town established itself as a market town, growing steadily and remaining unaffected by war and conflict. The town walls were eventually reduced to the level of a single storey building, and the stone used to build residential housing.

When Countess Margarete of Tyrol married the Bavarian, Duke Louis V the Brandenburger, in 1342, Kitzbühel was temporarily united with the County of Tyrol (that in turn became a Bavarian dominion as a result of the marriage until Louis' death). After the Peace of Schärding (1369) Kitzbühel was returned to Bavaria. Following the division of Bavaria, Kufstein went to the Landshut line of the House of Wittelsbach. During this time, silver and copper mining in Kitzbühel expanded steadily and comprehensive mining rights were issued to her that, later, were to become significant to the Bavarian dukedom. On 30 June 1504 Kitzbühel became a part of Tyrol permanently: the Emperor Maximilian reserved to himself the hitherto Landshut offices of Kitzbühel, Kufstein and Rattenberg as a part of his Cologne Arbitration, that had ended the Landshut War of Succession.

However ,the law of Louis of Bavaria continued to apply to the three aforementioned places until the 19th century, so that these towns had a special legal status within Tyrol. Maximilian enfeoffed Kitzbühel, with the result that it came under the rule of the Counts of Lamberg at the end of the 16th century, until 1 May 1840, when Kitzbühel was ceremonially transferred to the state.

An inscription in the Swedish Chapel dating to the Swedish War states  ("The Swedish knights came as far as here but no further.")

18th century to modern day
The wars of the 18th and 19th century bypassed the town, even though its inhabitants participated in the Tyrolean Rebellion against Napoleon. Following the Treaty of Pressburg in 1805, Kitzbühel once more became part of Bavaria; it was reunited with Tyrol after the fall of Napoleon at the Congress of Vienna. Until 1918, the town (named  before 1895) was part of the Austrian monarchy (Austria side after the compromise of 1867), head of the district of the same name, one of the 21  in the Tyrol province.

When Emperor Franz Joseph finally resolved the confusing constitutional situation, and following completion of the Salzburg-Tyrol Railway in 1875, the town's trade and industry flourished. In 1894, Kitzbühel hosted its first ski race, ushering in a new era of tourism and sport.

Kitzbühel was the town to host the remenants of the Nazi made Serbian collaborationist government the Government of National Salvation from 1944 to the end of the war. Kitzbühel also had the good fortune to remain undamaged from the ravages of the First and Second World Wars.
Since the year 2000 the town has been a member of the Climate Alliance of Tyrol.

In October 2019, a 25-year-old man in Kitzbühel shot and killed his ex-girlfriend, her family, and her new boyfriend after a dispute at a restaurant.

The town's demographic evolution between 1869 and 2017 is shown in the list to the right.

Places of interest 

 St. Catherine's Church: built 1360–1365, High Gothic church in the heart of the town with a coppersmith altar; the high tower with its spire is a striking landmark in the town centre. Its carillon sounds at 11 am and 5 pm.
 Protestant Christ's Church in Kitzbühel: built in 1962 by Clemens Holzmeister
 Reisch Dance Cafe: built in 1928 by Lois Welzenbacher (architect of the Tiroler Moderne); the Plahl Medical Practice (Arzthaus) was also designed by him
 Berghaus Holzmeister, a guesthouse on Kitzbühel's local mountain, the Hahnenkamm; built in 1930 by Clemens Holzmeister
 Berghaus by Alfons Walde, 100m away
 Fresco by Max Weiler (1951) in Kitzbühel Primary School (Volksschule)
 Newly built tri-cable system by the firm of Doppelmayr, the cable car with the highest elevation above the ground in the world.
Museum Kitzbühel - Collection Alfons Walde: the new renovated museum presents the history of the town, from 1000 years ago to the winter sports era; it also includes a larger permanent exhibition of the Tyrolean painter Alfons Walde.

Personalities

In the 1950s, local legends like Ernst Hinterseer, Hias Leitner, Anderl Molterer, Christian Pravda, Fritz Huber Jr. and Toni Sailer wrote skiing history. They put Kitzbühel on the map and their names still resonate today. Now there is a new generation earning the title of Kitzbühel legends: Rosi Schipflinger, Axel Naglich, Kaspar Frauenschuh, and David Kreiner. Along with sporting achievements, fashion, and food, they are part of Kitzbühel's unique culture:

Karl Wilhelm von Dalla Torre (1850–1928), Austrian entomologist and botanist
Alfons Walde (1891–1958), Austrian expressionist painter and architect
Peter Aufschnaiter (1899–1973), Austrian mountaineer and geographer
Anderl Molterer (born 1931), Austrian alpine skier
Ernst Hinterseer (born 1932), Austrian alpine skier
Toni Sailer (1935–2009), legendary Austrian alpine skier and actor
Hias Leitner (born 1935), Austrian alpine skier
Georg Hochfilzer (born 1937), famous international hotel director of the Hotel Bristol in Vienna
Christl Haas (1943–2001), Austrian alpine skier
 Jörg Friedrich (born 1944) German author and historian
Roman Strobl (born 1951), Austrian sculptor
Hansi Hinterseer (1954), Austrian alpine skier and singer
Klaus Sulzenbacher (born 1965), Austrian Nordic skier
Markus Gandler (born 1966), Austrian cross-country skier
Manuel Schmid (born 1981), Austrian footballer

Famous inhabitants of Kitzbühel

Franz Beckenbauer, German soccer player and manager
Uschi Glas, German actress
Leni Riefenstahl  (1902–2003), German filmmaker, photographer and dancer
Ian Fleming (1908–1964), British spy novel author 
Heinrich Harrer (1912–2006), Austrian mountaineer, author and geographer
Patricia Lopez-Willshaw (1912–2010), Chilean style and fashion icon
Trude Dreihann-Lechle (1919-2014), Austrian skier, actress and camerawoman
Werner Baldessarini (born 1945), Austrian fashion designer and businessman, formerly chairman of Hugo Boss
Ireen Sheer (born 1949), German-British pop singer
Haddaway (Nestore Alexander Haddaway) (born 1965), Trinidadian-German singer whose best-known hit was "What Is Love"
Philipp Kohlschreiber (born 1983), German tennis player

Sport 
The Hahnenkamm hosts the annual World Cup ski races, including the circuit's most notable event, the Hahnenkamm Races on the notable Streif slope. Introduced  in 1937, the northeast-facing Streif is among the world's toughest downhill courses, if not the most, and is infamous for an abundance of spectacular crashes. In 1959 the Austrian Alpine Ski Championships took place from 27 February to 1 March.

Each summer Kitzbühel also hosts an ATP tennis tournament on clay, the Austrian Open.

From 2007 to 2011, ITU Triathlon World Cup races took place at the local Schwarzsee lake.

The Kitzbüheler Alpenrallye is an annual festival of historic automobiles, first held  in 1988. The first trip of the United Buddy Bears was 2004 to Kitzbühel, following by the first trip into the "big wide world" – when they went to Hong Kong and many other metropolises on all five continents.

Since 2003, Kitzbühel has been hosting an annual Snow Polo event in January.

Tourism 

Together with the pistes and ski lifts in neighbouring Kirchberg in Tirol, Jochberg and by the Thurn Pass Kitzbühel is one of the largest ski regions in Austria. With around 10,000 hotel and guest house beds, Kitzbühel and its neighbours have an unusually high density of guest accommodation.

Holidaymakers in Kitzbühel have 56 cableway and lift facilities and 168 kilometres of slopes available to them, as well as 40 kilometres of groomed cross-country skiing tracks. Of note is the relatively new 3S Cable Car, the cable car with the highest above-ground span in the world.

Other attractions include six tennis courts and four golf courses, the Kitzbühel swimming pool, Austria's only curling hall and the bathing lake of Schwarzsee.

Kitzbühel primarily caters for the high end of the tourist market, as many celebrities and the jet set come here, especially during the international races on the Hahnenkamm.

Together with eleven other towns Kitzbühel is a member of the community Best of the Alps. KitzSki, Kitzbühel's main ski lift operator, has managed to defend the title of “World's Best Ski Resort Company” for the seventh time in a row at the 2020 World Ski Awards.

Music
An International Polkafest was held in Kitzbühel in 1978.

Transport 
Road:

The Brixental Road, the B170, from Wörgl intersects in Kitzbühel with the Thurn Pass Road, the B161, from Mittersill to St. Johann in Tirol. Kitzbühel station is a major bus stop for buses to Lienz and Wörgl.

Rail:

Kitzbühel Hauptbahnhof, Kitzbühel Hahnenkamm and Kitzbühel Schwarzsee are stops on the Salzburg-Tyrol Railway. Whilst Hahnenkamm and Schwarzsee stations are served by local trains only, long-distance services from Innsbruck and Graz stop at Kitzbühel station. Kitzbühel station has just been rebuilt (2010) and been equipped with new barrier-less platforms with underpasses and a lift. From 2011 there will be no stationmaster at Kitzbühel and it will no longer be possible to buy tickets at the counter.

International relations

Twin towns – sister cities
Kitzbühel is twinned with:

 Greenwich, Connecticut, since 1961
 Yamagata, Japan, since 1963
 Sun Valley, Idaho, since 1967
 Sterzing, Italy, since 1971
 Rueil-Malmaison, France, since 1979
 Bad Soden am Taunus, Germany, since 1984

Gallery

Panorama

See also 

 Salzburg
 Salzburgerland

Notes and references

External links

Tourist office Kitzbühel
Kitzbühel Gigapixel Panorama (20.000 Megapixel)
Kitzbühel Ski Slopes Photo Gallery
Bergbahn Kitzbühel - mountain railway
Museum Kitzbühel - Alfons Walde
(https://www.skiline.co.uk/blog/new-ski-circuit-in-austrias-tyrol)

 
Ski areas and resorts in Austria
Kitzbühel Alps
Cities and towns in Kitzbühel District